Rinat Fatakhetdinov (born 23 January 1971 in Moscow) is a former Russian football player.

Fatakhetdinov played in the Russian Premier League with FC Dynamo-Gazovik Tyumen.

References

1971 births
Footballers from Moscow
Living people
Soviet footballers
Russian footballers
FC Tyumen players
Russian Premier League players
Association football forwards
FC Iskra Smolensk players